Joshua Brett Kimbrell (born December 18, 1984) is an American aviation leasing operator and politician. He is also a former Christian talk radio host.

Kimbrell has served as a  member of the South Carolina Senate from the 11th District since his 2020 election. He is a member of the Republican Party.

Politics
Kimbrell unsuccessfully ran for the United States House of Representatives from South Carolina's 4th congressional district in 2018, finishing fourth in a 13-candidate Republican primary.

In 2020, Kimbrell unseated incumbent Democrat Glenn G. Reese, who had held the seat in the South Carolina Senate's 11th District since 1991.

Personal life 
In October 2014, Kimbrell was arrested and charged with sex crimes against his 3-year-old son. After being held in jail without bail, the charges were dropped due to insufficient evidence in February 2015.

Legislative career
In June 2021, Kimbrell sponsored a bill in the state senate that would "allow mental health professionals to refuse to provide care that violates their religious beliefs." During the 2022 session, Kimbrell also introduced a budget proviso to ban "prurient" books in children's library sections at public libraries, though some librarians and other lawmakers said the language was too vague to enforce without banning a wide variety of books.

References

Living people
1984 births
People from Spartanburg, South Carolina
Republican Party South Carolina state senators
21st-century American politicians
North Greenville University alumni
Gardner–Webb University alumni
American talk radio hosts